Bernard William "Beanie" Berens Jr. (February 26, 1913 – May 29, 1979) was an American professional basketball player. He played for Columbus Athletic Supply in the National Basketball League, among other teams in various leagues.

In his post-basketball career, Berens became a schoolteacher and high school basketball coach in his hometown of Lancaster, Ohio.

References

1913 births
1979 deaths
American men's basketball players
Basketball players from Ohio
Centers (basketball)
Columbus Athletic Supply players
High school basketball coaches in Ohio
Ohio Bobcats men's basketball players
People from Lancaster, Ohio